Monet-Goyon was a French motorcycle manufacturer, founded in 1917 by the engineer Joseph Monet and his financial backer Adrien Goyon in Mâcon, France.

References

Further reading
 Gagnaire, Michel and Méneret, Franck, Monet & Goyon : la moto française (French language), Boulogne-Billancourt, ETAI, 2006.

External links

 Monet-Goyon & Koehler-Escoffier on the net (French language)

Motorcycle manufacturers of France
Vehicle manufacturing companies established in 1917
Defunct motor vehicle manufacturers of France
Vehicle manufacturing companies disestablished in 1959
1917 establishments in France
1959 disestablishments in France